Fernando García Paredes, nicknamed Nito (born 26 December 1939) is a Spanish former professional footballer who played as a forward.

Career
Born in Guardamar del Segura, Nito played for Real Murcia. His older brother Joaquín, also known as "Nito", was also a footballer.

References

1939 births
Living people
Spanish footballers
Real Murcia players
Segunda División players
Association football forwards
People from Vega Baja del Segura
Sportspeople from the Province of Alicante